"Somebody Slap Me" is a song recorded by American country music artist John Anderson.  It was released in July 1997 as the first single from the album Takin' the Country Back.  The song reached #22 on the Billboard Hot Country Single & Tracks chart.  The song was written by Bob McDill and Roger Murrah.

Chart performance

References

1997 singles
1997 songs
John Anderson (musician) songs
Songs written by Bob McDill
Songs written by Roger Murrah
Song recordings produced by Keith Stegall
Mercury Records singles